Henrietta Ippolitovna Poplavskaja (1885–1956) was a Soviet botanist noted for plant collecting and identification in the Russian Federation alongside her husband Vladimir Nikolajevich Sukaczev.

References 

1885 births
1956 deaths
Soviet botanists